Kapital Entertainment is an American entertainment company founded by Aaron Kaplan in 2009. Prior to founding Kapital, Kaplan was the worldwide head of scripted television at William Morris Agency to which he joined in 1991. He exited the company in 2009 after 18 years when WMA was going through the regulatory process to finalize their merger with Endeavor to form WME Entertainment.

Kapital has since produced shows for many different networks such as CBS, Netflix, Amazon, Showtime, MTV, ABC, NBC, Fox, and HBO. Some of the companies productions include Terra Nova, Life in Pieces, The Mysteries of Laura, American Housewife, The Chi, Fam, and Santa Clarita Diet.

Kapital also has two pod deals, one in 2014 with development executive Tracy Katsky via KatCo which produces Santa Clarita Diet and another in 2016 with former longtime head of comedy at CBS Wendi Trilling to launch TrillTV. Both pods are based at Kapital's offices in West Hollywood.

On February 10, 2017, Kapital formed a joint venture with CBS Corporation and has acquired an ownership stake. CBS will also provide co-financing for Kapital projects and will serve as worldwide distributor. However, Kapital will continue to operate as it had previously as an independent production company which will be completely separate from CBS Television Studios (later CBS Studios) and CBS Television Network and have no first-look or any other agreements with any of them.

Shows produced

Future productions

References

External links 
 

2009 establishments in California
Entertainment companies based in California
Television production companies of the United States
Paramount Global subsidiaries
Mass media companies established in 2009
Companies based in West Hollywood, California